Autonomic Neuroscience: Basic and Clinical is a peer-reviewed scientific journal covering research on the autonomic nervous system. It is published by Elsevier and is the official journal of the International Society for Autonomic Neuroscience. It was established by Chandler McCluskey Brooks in 1978 as the Journal of the Autonomic Nervous System and obtained its current title in 2000. From 1985, and for many years thereafter, the editor-in-chief was Geoffrey Burnstock (UCL Medical School), who was succeeded by Roy Freeman.

The journal is abstracted and indexed by MEDLINE/PubMed. According to the Journal Citation Reports, the journal has a 2018 impact factor of 2.247.

References

External links

Neuroscience journals
Elsevier academic journals
Publications established in 1978
English-language journals
8 times per year journals